56 may refer to: 
 56 (number)
 one of the years 56 BC, AD 56, 1856, 1956, 2056
 56.com, a Chinese online video platform
 Fiftysix, Arkansas, unincorporated community in United States
 Fifty-Six, Arkansas, city in United States
 "Fifty Six", a song by Karma to Burn from the album Arch Stanton, 2014
 Cityrider 56, a bus route in the United Kingdom